This can refer to:

 École secondaire catholique Franco-Cité- Public Catholic French high school in Ottawa, Ontario.
 École secondaire catholique Franco-Cité (Nipissing) - Public Catholic French high school in West Nipissing, Ontario.